Jake Rosenzweig (born April 14, 1989 in London) is an English-born American racing driver.

Career

Karting
Much of Rosenzweig's early karting career was contested in the United Kingdom, with him competing in Super 1 karting championships. In 2001, Rosenzweig finished fifth in the Cadet Championship, having been outside the top thirty positions the previous season. 2002 saw Rosenzweig step up to JICA karts, again competing in the Super 1 championship, staying there for two seasons with an additional shot at the Andrea Margutti Trophy in 2004.

After a season out in 2005, Rosenzweig moved up to ICA karts for the 2006 season. Rosenzweig contested the Stars of Karting championship in the United States, finishing eighth overall in the championship standings. He also made appearances in the WSK International Series and Italian Open Masters, scoring nine points in both series. Rosenzweig remained in the States to contest the most part of his 2007 karting campaign, claiming both the ICA Florida Winter Tour and the Canadian ICC Championship, and finished runner-up in two other championships – Stars of Karting National and East series – losing out to British racer Scott Jenkins on both occasions. He also finished thirteenth at the SuperNationals event in Las Vegas, Nevada, beating the likes of Raphael Matos and Phil Giebler.

Formula Renault
After contesting the 2008 24 Hours of Daytona for Alegra Motorsports, Rosenzweig stepped up to Formula Renault, moving to the Epsilon Euskadi team and contesting both the Eurocup and the new-for-2008 West European Cup. In the Eurocup, Rosenzweig finished all bar one race, and recorded two points-scoring finishes – tenth-place finishes at Le Mans and Barcelona – en route to a 28th-place finish in the final championship standings. In the WEC, Rosenzweig was a regular points-scoring finisher, finishing eight of the fifteen races in such a position. At season's end, Rosenzweig finished in a tie with Spain's Miquel Monrás on thirty points, with the Spanish driver earning eighth place via a best finish of third at Valencia compared to Rosenzweig's best finish of fifth at Estoril. Rosenzweig contested six races of the Porsche Carrera Cup Great Britain for Team Parker Racing, and despite not being able to amass championship points, Rosenzweig impressed including setting the fastest lap during the first race at the season finale at Brands Hatch.

Formula Three
Rosenzweig moved up to Formula Three for 2009, contesting the Formula Three Euroseries for Carlin Motorsport. Rosenzweig finished just three of the races in the top ten positions, but one of those was a podium at Zandvoort. Starting second on the grid, Rosenzweig ran behind Sam Bird in second place, but both men were passed by Bird's team-mate Jules Bianchi. He also made a guest appearance in the British Formula 3 Championship, guesting at the Spa round for Carlin. He finished fifth in race one, before failing to finish in the second race. In the non-championship races at Zandvoort and Macau, Rosenzweig finished 29th in the Netherlands, while he failed to finish at Macau due to a first lap crash. He again contested six races of the Porsche Carrera Cup Great Britain for Team Parker Racing.

GP2 Series
Rosenzweig tested a GP2 car for Super Nova Racing during the mass test at Circuit Paul Ricard in November 2009. He would later join the team for the final two rounds of the 2009–10 GP2 Asia Series, replacing Marcus Ericsson alongside Josef Král.

Rosenzweig made his main series début in the non-championship GP2 Final in 2011 with the Super Nova team. He returned to the series for the penultimate round of the 2012 championship at Monza, replacing Josef Král in the Addax team, alongside Johnny Cecotto Jr.

Formula Renault 3.5 Series

Rosenzweig moved into the Formula Renault 3.5 Series for the 2010 season, remaining with his Euroseries team, Carlin. He joined Mikhail Aleshin at the team. He finished in 19th place in the drivers' championship, with a best finish of seventh in the season-opener at Aragón. He also made a guest appearance in the Auto GP series with Super Nova.

Rosenzweig remained in the series for 2011, moving to the Mofaz Racing team where he was partnered with first Chris van der Drift and later Fairuz Fauzy. He improved to 15th in the championship with a brace of fourth places at Ricard. He has moved to the ISR Racing team for the 2012 season, alongside Sam Bird.

Racing record

Career summary

† – As Rosenzweig was a guest driver, he was ineligible for points.

Complete Formula 3 Euro Series results
(key) (Races in bold indicate pole position; races in italics indicate fastest lap)

† Driver did not finish the race, but was classified as he completed over 90% of the race distance.

Complete Formula Renault 3.5 Series results
(key) (Races in bold indicate pole position) (Races in italics indicate fastest lap)

† Driver did not finish the race, but was classified as he completed more than 90% of the race distance.

Complete GP2 Series results
(key) (Races in bold indicate pole position) (Races in italics indicate fastest lap)

† Driver did not finish the race, but was classified as he completed more than 90% of the race distance.

Complete GP2 Asia Series results
(key) (Races in bold indicate pole position) (Races in italics indicate fastest lap)

Complete GP2 Final results
(key) (Races in bold indicate pole position) (Races in italics indicate fastest lap)

References

External links

 Official website
 Career statistics from Driver Database

1989 births
Living people
Sportspeople from London
American racing drivers
GP2 Asia Series drivers
British Formula Three Championship drivers
Formula 3 Euro Series drivers
Formula Renault Eurocup drivers
Formula Renault 2.0 WEC drivers
Rolex Sports Car Series drivers
World Series Formula V8 3.5 drivers
GP2 Series drivers
Buckingham Browne & Nichols School alumni
Porsche Carrera Cup GB drivers
Carlin racing drivers
Epsilon Euskadi drivers
Fortec Motorsport drivers
Super Nova Racing drivers
ISR Racing drivers